Volinja is a village in central Croatia, in the municipality of Dvor, Sisak-Moslavina County.

Demographics
According to the 2011 census, the village of Volinja 
has 77 inhabitants. This represents 33.77% of its pre-war population according to the 1991 census.

The 1991 census recorded that 91.67% of the village population were ethnic Serbs (209/228),  3.51% were ethnic Croats (8/228), 2.19% were Yugoslavs (5/228) and 2.63% were of other/unknown ethnic origin (6/228).

References

Populated places in Sisak-Moslavina County
Serb communities in Croatia